Pterophorus niveodactyla is a moth of the family Pterophoridae. It is found in Taiwan, China, India, Sri Lanka, Malaya, Java, Sumatra, the Philippines, Borneo, New Guinea, Micronesia, the Bismarck Islands, the Solomon Islands and São Tomé & Principe.

The length of the forewings is 8–9 mm. Adults have whitish wings without dark brown dots.

The larvae feed on the young leaves of Ipomoea species, eating the leaves from the outside and not entering within the unexpanded leaf. They are uniform pale yellowish-green and thickly studded with long tufts of whitish hairs. Pupation takes place in a green pupa, which is thickly covered with pale green hairs and with an interrupted dorsal and sub-dorsal row of black spots.

References

External links
Insects of Micronesia Volume 9, no. 3 Lepidoptera: Pterophoridae

Moths described in 1900
niveodactyla
Moths of Asia
Insects of Papua New Guinea
Moths of São Tomé and Príncipe
Moths of Africa
Moths of Oceania